Shades of Life (Traditional Chinese: 我們的天空; literally "Our Sky") is a 2014 Hong Kong modern drama produced by TVB, starring Jack Wu and Elaine Yiu. The series began airing on July 20, 2014 and was broadcast on the following Sundays at 9:00 p.m with 12 episodes in total.

The series centers around the Ko family, a modern Hong Kong family and the ordinary people they encounter. The series tells of the struggles and social issue of ordinary Hong Konger. Each episode does not continue on from the previous episode and each is a new standalone story.

Main cast

Ko family
Jack Wu as Ko Ho Pan 高可攀: Tung Ngoi Ting's husband and San Ting's father. He works as a reporter. 
Elaine Yiu as Tung Ngoi Ting 董愛晴: Ko Ho Pan's wife and San Ting's mother. She works as a personal tour person for VIP tourist. 
Henry Yu as Ko Baat Dau 高八斗: Ho Pan and Ho Yen's father. A retired school principal. 
Zoie Tam as Ko Ho Yen 高可人: Ho Pan's younger sister. A design student.
Albert Lo as Ko San Ting 高山青: Ko Ho Pan and Tung Ngoi Ting's preteen son.

Tung family
Albert Law as Tung Fu Gwai 董富貴: Tung Ngoi Ting's arrogant and greedy father who invest in real-estate to make a living. 
Angelina Lo as Mrs. Tung 董太: Tung Ngoi Ting's materialistic and greedy mother.

Synopsis and cast
Episode 1: Succeed 望子成龍
 Mandy Lam as Mrs. Lau 劉太
 Raymond Chiu as Lau Chi Yen 劉志仁
 Andrew Au as Dicky Lau 劉迪奇
Ko San Ting's classmate Dicky is the best in his class, always getting the highest grade on each test, but San Ting does not understand why Dicky always looks sad, tired and worried. On top of that Dicky is never satisfied with his test scores unless he gets a 100.

Episode 2: Same Root 同根生
 Océane Zhu as Wong Mei Fan 王美芬
 Leung Hoi Lam as Chan Bo Yee 陳寶儀
While researching for his next article Ho Pan encounters new immigrant Wong Mei Fan and her preteen daughter Chan Bo Yee. Mei Fan and her daughter has high hopes when they arrive in Hong Kong from mainland China, but the two are soon faced with discrimination, prejudice and struggles.

Episode 3: Influence Life With Life 非常校長
 Ben Wong as Ma Wui Jung 馬匯忠
 Rachel Kan as Ho Yuk San 何玉珊
Ko Ho Yen stands up for a teacher tutoring a student at a fast food restaurant, coincidentally the teacher becomes Ho Pan's next article. Ma Wui Jung was a former high school principal who gave up his steady income job to devote his full-time to tutoring less fortunate students. By following his dream he puts his marriage and family income at risk.

Episode 4: Sub-divided Hero 劏房英雄
 Law Lok Lam as Frankie
 Lau Kong as Fung Bak 豐伯
Ho Pan sees an elderly man named Frankie on television being interviewed by news reporters during a government housing demonstration and tells his boss that he would like to do a magazine article on the elderly man. Frankie, who was a police officer in his younger years, speaks English very well but because of his gambling problems he has to resort to living in poor condition, illegal, sub-divided apartments during his elderly years. He gets by, by collecting the rents for the slum lord. Frankie meets Fung Bak, another elderly man who is looking for cheap housing because his son's family has grown and their little apartment does not have enough room for all of them. Fung Bak, thinking his separation from his family is temporary since they are on the waiting list for public housing, lies to his family that he is living with a friend.

Episode 5: Winter's Fairy-tale 冬天的童話
 Gary Tam as Cheung Huk Kau 張學求
 Skye Chan as Lau Siu Wan 劉小雲
 Owen Cheung as Cheung Si Tim 張思甜
Ho Pan interviews Cheung Huk Kau, a former student of his father who has a rags to riches story to tell. Huk Kau owns and manages a multi-million dollar garbage disposal and cleaning company but his beginnings were very humbled. Due to his mother's illness Huk Kau had to quit school and take over his mother's job full time as a cleaner. Through hard work and the help of his wife he was able to turn his one man company into one of Hong Kong's biggest cleaning companies.

Episode 6: Successor 接班人
 Brian Chu as Cheng Chi Ho 鄭志豪
 Lily Poon as Helen
Ho Pan and his assistant Chi Ho, encounter a car accident in the street, seeing Chi Ho hustle at the accident scene Pan thinks back to when Chi Ho first joined the magazine. Chi Ho overly protective mother Helen got him the job at the magazine and would sit by his desk at work to watch over him. As Chi Ho tags along with Ho Pan to cover stories for their articles he soon learns to become independent and a hard worker. At the same time Ho Pan interviews two recent college graduates who are overly ambitious and want to be on the top of the work force ladder right away.

Episode 7: Dream Dwelling 蝸居夢
 Leanne Li as Ko Lei Ting 郭麗青
 William Chak as Hung Jik 洪翼
 Stanley Cheung as Kwong Chi Hung 鄺志雄
 Gregory Lee as Fung Jun Yin 方津然
Three of Ho Pan's friends, Hung Jik, Kwong Chi Hung and Fung Jun Yin are desperate to buy a flat for their marriages. Ho Pan refers them to his father-in-law Tung Fu Gwai, who likes to invest in real-estate and then re-sell it at a higher price. The three friends agree on the price and decide to go in together to buy Fu Gwai's flat. They each raise their share of the money by taking out their savings and borrowing from family, but on the day of the sale Fu Gwai raises the sale price because according to him recent real-estate price in Hong Kong has risen. With their dream of owning their own flat gone, Hung Jik decides to move to Singapore to be with his fiancée.

Episode 8: So Close, So Far 這麼近, 那麼遠

Episode 9: Father and I 公公與我
 Elliot Ngok as Cheung Kit 張健

Episode 10: What Is Good 餘何是好
 Det Dik as Leung 亮
 Wong Hin Chung as Cyu 柱
 Kinko Koo as Chum 沈

Episode 11: Sunset Warrior 夕陽戰士
 Tsui Gwok Hing as Den Wong 電王
 Stephen Wong Ka-lok as Wai San 惠新
 Leo Lee as Wai Kit 惠健

Episode 12: Homeward Bound 歸去來兮
 Mat Yeung as Kwong Chi Hung 鄺志雄
 Jason Chan Chi-san as Chris

Viewership Ratings

Controversies
Shades of Life received over 1500 complaints in its 2nd week of airing. The series was slammed for depicting Hong Kong citizens in a negatively and inaccurate portrayal of stereotypes. Also providing misleading information when depicting other country societies, such as episode 1 where it is mentioned about the difference between Hong Kong students and American students, one of the characters ask "why Hong Kong students carry backpacks to school when in the United States students does not carry backpacks because everything they need is already provided by the school".

References

External links
TVB Official Website (Chinese)

TVB dramas
Hong Kong television series
2010s Hong Kong television series
2014 Hong Kong television series debuts
2014 Hong Kong television series endings